George Helm Yeaman (November 1, 1829 – February 23, 1908) was an American politician who served as a U.S. Representative from Kentucky, and as U.S. Ambassador to Denmark.

Early life and education
Yeaman was born in Hardin County, Kentucky, the son of Lucretia Sneed (Helm) and Steven Minor Yeaman. Yeaman completed preparatory studies and studied law. He was admitted to the bar in 1852 and commenced practice in Owensboro, Kentucky. He served as judge of Daviess County in 1854, and served as member of the Kentucky House of Representatives in 1861.

Career
Yeaman was elected as a Unionist to the Thirty-seventh Congress to fill the vacancy caused by the resignation of James S. Jackson. He was reelected to the Thirty-eighth Congress and served from December 1, 1862, to March 3, 1865. He was an unsuccessful candidate for reelection in 1864 to the Thirty-ninth Congress.  He provided a critical vote for passing the Thirteenth Amendment to the United States Constitution abolishing slavery through the US House of Representatives.

Yeaman served as the United States Minister to Denmark from 1865 to 1870. He resigned in 1870 and settled in New York City.
He then served as a lecturer on constitutional law at Columbia College. He served as president of the Medico-Legal Society of New York.

Yeaman died in Jersey City, New Jersey, on February 23, 1908. He was interred in Hillside Cemetery, Madison, New Jersey.

Yeaman was a slave owner.

In film
In the 2012 film, Lincoln, Yeaman was played by Michael Stuhlbarg.

References

1829 births
1908 deaths
People from Hardin County, Kentucky
Kentucky Unionists
Unionist Party members of the United States House of Representatives from Kentucky
Ambassadors of the United States to Denmark
19th-century American diplomats
LaRue family
19th-century American politicians
Members of the United States House of Representatives from Kentucky